RevoKnuckle is a variation of the MacPherson strut suspension design by Ford which separates steering and suspension movements to provide lower scrub radius and kingpin offset than traditional MacPherson struts.

Details
Ford claims that it weighs less and costs less than double wishbone and multi-link suspension arrangement. The kingpin offset compares favorably to that of double wishbone suspensions (20-30mm vs 40mm).
The main advantage of RevoKnuckle compared to MacPherson struts is the reduction in torque steer, especially for high powered front-wheel drive (FWD) applications.

The RevoKnuckle is intended for use on FWD platforms such as the Focus and Mondeo, and was used in the RS Mk2 version of the Ford Focus.

References

External links
 http://www.motorauthority.com/blog/1032432_in-depth-fords-revoknuckle-suspension-and-quaife-lsd-for-the-focus-rs
 http://www.autolinedetroit.tv/daily/?p=2934

Ford Motor Company